Taylor Gang may refer to:

 "Taylor Gang" (song), a 2011 song by American rapper Wiz Khalifa
 Taylor Gang Records
 Jack Taylor Gang, an outlaw gang of the Old West